is a Japanese footballer currently playing as a goalkeeper for Iwate Grulla Morioka.

Career statistics

Club
.

Notes

References

1998 births
Living people
Association football people from Fukuoka Prefecture
Momoyama Gakuin University alumni
Japanese footballers
Association football goalkeepers
J2 League players
Iwate Grulla Morioka players